The last prophet, or final prophet, is a term used in religious contexts to refer to the last person through whom God speaks, after which there is to be no other. The appellation also refers to the prophet who will induce mankind to turn back to God.

Abrahamic religions

Judaism
Judaism considers Malachi to be the last of the biblical prophets, but believes that the Messiah will be a prophet and that there will possibly be other prophets alongside him.

Christianity

In Christianity, the last prophet of the Old Covenant before the arrival of Jesus is John the Baptist (cf. ). The Eastern Orthodox Church holds that Malachi was the "Seal of Prophets" in the Old Testament. Christian denominations who hold that spiritual gifts (including prophecy) continue to be bestowed by the Holy Spirit on Christians are known as "continuationists" (including Catholics, Methodists, and Pentecostals), while the cessationist perspective, which teaches that charismata ended in the Apostolic era, is held by much of Reformed Christianity and Baptists.

The Iglesia ni Cristo, an independent, nontrinitarian Christian religion based in the Philippines, professes that founder and first Executive Minister Felix Manalo was the last messenger sent by God to reestablish the original church founded by Jesus.

Gnosticism
In Mandaeism, John the Baptist is the greatest and final prophet.

Mani, founder of the Persian faith Manichaeism, also claimed to be the Seal of the Prophets and the last prophet.

Islam

The phrase Khatamu ’n-Nabiyyīn ("Seal of the Prophets") is a title used in the Quran to designate the Islamic prophet Muhammad. It is generally regarded to mean that Muhammad is the last of the prophets sent by God.

Dharmic religions

Hinduism
In Hinduism, the history of mankind is described in four religious (dharmic) ages (yugas), which depict a gradual decline in religious activities, only to be renewed at the end to start a new cycle of the four ages. At the end of the Kali Yuga, the current and last age in a cycle, Kalki, the tenth avatar of Vishnu, is prophesied to appear to punish the wicked, reward the good, and inaugurate the Satya Yuga of the next cycle. Kalki is the last avatar in the current cycle.

References

Titles of Muhammad
Prophets